The Diceman is an adventure travelogue television series, commissioned by the Discovery Channel and produced by Little Planet Media, originally aired between 1997 and 2001. It depicts a presenter (Russell Harris) and cameraman (Shaun Fenton) making decisions about where to go and what to do based on rolling a die.

The team have no means of transport of their own, and carry a small amount of money and basic necessities. Each episode starts with the presenter and the cameraman drawing up a list of six options either chosen by themselves, or by the public around them at the time. These options could be for modes of transport, directions, places to visit, things to do, challenges or other objectives. Each die selection is then worked to a conclusion, and a fresh set of options are drawn up every time a decision has to be made.

Four 15-part series where eventually produced, totaling 60 programmes and travelling around 32,000 miles across 14 different countries. Travel was made on foot and by bus, taxi, bicycle, ferry, private aircraft, yacht, water taxi, airline, rickshaw, hire car, motorbike, hot-air balloon and hitch-hiking. Nearly six months was spent on the road in total. The die was rolled some 400 times. Activities selected included playing golf on the ice in Greenland to selling pretzels on the streets of New York. The series ended with the die tumbling into a river and being lost.

Seasons

Series One
"Russell Harris is The Diceman and with his cameraman Shaun Fenton, they embark on a totally random journey – where everything is decided by the Dice. Russell and Shaun begin their adventure in Russell's home town of Lymm and from there travel across the UK and Ireland. Amongst a wealth of activities, the intrepid duo fish for their supper in Scotland, travel through historic York, take a Turkish bath in Harrogate and play a spot of cricket in the Yorkshire Dales!"

Series Two
"The Diceman is back on the road again continuing his random journey across the UK, the Channel Islands, Denmark and Greenland. We start in London where the police give a helping hand. Leaving London, Russell and Shaun test a luxury marine craft in Poole harbour, hunt for fossils in Lyme Regis and investigate a haunted castle in Belfast. Greenland proves to be an exhilarating place for The Diceman. Snow scooters, fantastic scenery, skiing are just a few samples of what Greenland has to offer the dice."

Series Three
"Series Three starts where Russell and Shaun finished off in the last – Near Gatwick Airport and with the help of the dice, takes them across the UK, Holland, Germany and Poland. The pair enjoy an afternoon tea with Llamas, take an Iguana for a walk, dabble in metal detecting, palm reading, skiing in Tunbridge Wells, pub crawling in Belgium, diamond cutting in Amsterdam and sailing in Berlin and much more! What else will the dice throw at them?"

Series Four
"In a new series of The Diceman, Russell Harris and Cameraman Shaun Fenton travel across the Atlantic on a random journey all over the USA. Starting off their journey from the Greenwich Observatory, rolls of the dice take them to the Florida Everglades, Miami, Daytona Beach, New Orleans, the Cajun Country, Georgetown, Washington, D.C., Texas, the Colorado River and Hawaii, just to mention a few! Each location and what the pair get up to whilst there, is all decided by the roll of the dice!"

External links
The Diceman series website

Discovery Channel original programming
1997 American television series debuts
2001 American television series endings
British travel television series